The 2017 Elimination Chamber (known as No Escape in Germany) was the seventh Elimination Chamber professional wrestling pay-per-view (PPV) and livestreaming event produced by WWE. It was held exclusively for wrestlers from the promotion's SmackDown brand division. The event took place on February 12, 2017, at the Talking Stick Resort Arena in Phoenix, Arizona. It was the first Elimination Chamber event to be held since the 2015 event and was WWE's first pay-per-view to feature three women's matches on the main card.

Eight matches were contested at the event, including one on the Kickoff pre-show. In the main event, Bray Wyatt won the titular Elimination Chamber match to win the WWE Championship, the first singles championship of his career. In other prominent matches, Naomi defeated Alexa Bliss to win the SmackDown Women's Championship, marking her first championship in WWE, Randy Orton defeated Luke Harper, American Alpha (Chad Gable and Jason Jordan) retained the SmackDown Tag Team Championship in a tag team turmoil match, and in the opening bout, Becky Lynch defeated Mickie James.

Production

Background

Elimination Chamber is a gimmick pay-per-view (PPV) and WWE Network event first produced by WWE in 2010. The concept of the show is that one or two main event matches are contested inside the Elimination Chamber, either with championships or future opportunities at championships at stake. The event had been held every year until 2016. That year, an Elimination Chamber event was not scheduled, however, on November 29, 2016, WWE reinstated the event for 2017, and announced that it would take place at the Talking Stick Resort Arena in Phoenix, Arizona. After the 2015 event was held in May, on December 5, the 2017 event returned Elimination Chamber to its regular February slot and it took place on February 12. It was the seventh Elimination Chamber and was held exclusively for wrestlers from the SmackDown brand, following the reintroduction of the brand split in July 2016. Tickets went on sale December 16 through Ticketmaster. The 2017 event also saw a redesign of the chamber structure, becoming square in design, instead of circular.

In 2011 and since 2013, the show has been promoted as "No Escape" in Germany as it was feared that the name "Elimination Chamber" may remind people of the gas chambers used during the Holocaust.

Storylines
The event compromised eight matches, including one on the Kickoff pre-show, that resulted from scripted storylines, where wrestlers portrayed heroes, villains, or less distinguishable characters in scripted events that built tension and culminated in a wrestling match or series of matches. Results were predetermined by WWE's writers on the SmackDown brand, while storylines were produced on WWE's weekly television show, SmackDown Live.

On the January 17, 2017, episode of SmackDown, commissioner Shane McMahon scheduled an Elimination Chamber match for the WWE Championship as the main event of Elimination Chamber. At the Royal Rumble on January 29, John Cena defeated AJ Styles to win the WWE Championship for a record thirteenth time, as well as tying Ric Flair's record of sixteen recognized world titles. The following day, Styles was added to the Elimination Chamber match. On the January 31 episode of SmackDown, McMahon and General Manager Daniel Bryan assured Styles that he would eventually get a one-on-one rematch, before revealing the other participants in the Elimination Chamber match: Intercontinental Champion Dean Ambrose, The Miz, Baron Corbin, and Bray Wyatt. Royal Rumble winner Randy Orton warned Cena that if he is still champion after Elimination Chamber, he will take the title from him at WrestleMania 33. Orton and Wyatt then faced Cena and Luke Harper, who had been at odds with Orton ever since they lost the tag team titles; Orton and Wyatt won the match when Orton pinned Cena. Later that night, Styles faced Ambrose with The Miz on commentary. Corbin came out during the match and joined on commentary, but eventually attacked Miz. Ambrose attacked both Corbin and Miz before re-entering the ring, allowing Styles to defeat him. The following week, Ambrose, Corbin, Miz, and Styles had a fatal four-way match that Corbin won by pinning Styles. Later, Orton faced Cena. During the match, Harper came out and attacked Wyatt. Orton attempted an RKO on Harper but got surprised by Cena with an Attitude Adjustment and a win for Cena; Orton was scheduled to face Harper at Elimination Chamber.

At Survivor Series on November 20, 2016, Nikki Bella was originally the captain of Team SmackDown's women's team, but before the match, she was attacked backstage and was unable to compete; Natalya, who was the team's coach, replaced Nikki in the match. On the following SmackDown, Nikki accused Carmella of being the attacker, since the two had been feuding for the few months prior, and the two faced each other at TLC: Tables, Ladders & Chairs on December 4 in a no disqualification match that Nikki won. After the match, Carmella claimed that Natalya was the attacker. For the next couple of weeks, Natalya denied the accusation until the December 20 episode of SmackDown, where she admitted to being the attacker due to pent up jealousy of the Bella Twins, believing they had everything handed to them. The two went back and forth at each other over the next few weeks and were involved in the six-woman tag team match at the Royal Rumble, where Nikki's team defeated Natalya's. On the January 31 episode of SmackDown, Daniel Bryan scheduled a match between Nikki and Natalya at Elimination Chamber to settle their differences. The following week, the two traded barbs with one another, and afterwards on Talking Smack, Natalya attacked Nikki.

On the December 20, 2016, episode of SmackDown, Becky Lynch, disguised as newcomer La Luchadora, defeated SmackDown Women's Champion Alexa Bliss in a non-title match when she made the champion submit to the Dis-arm-her; after the match, Lynch unmasked herself. Over the next few weeks, a villainous La Luchadora began to aid Bliss in matches against Lynch, including Bliss's successful title defense in a Steel Cage match in the main event of the January 17 episode, where La Luchadora was unmasked as the returning Mickie James. The following week, James explained that she became forgotten due to the Women's Revolution; Lynch then came out, but was ambushed by Bliss and James. Also, on the January 24 episode of SmackDown, Naomi was set to face Natalya, but the match was canceled after Nikki Bella attacked Natalya backstage. Naomi then made an open challenge. Bliss came out, not to accept the challenge, but to belittle Naomi. All four women then competed in the six-woman tag team match at the Royal Rumble, where Lynch and Naomi's team defeated Bliss and James' team after Naomi pinned Bliss. The four were then involved in a regular tag team match on the following episode of SmackDown, where Naomi again pinned Bliss. Afterwards on Talking Smack, Bliss was scheduled to defend the SmackDown Women's Championship against Naomi at Elimination Chamber. On February 7, a match between Lynch and James was scheduled for Elimination Chamber. On that night's episode of SmackDown, the four women had a contract signing for their respective matches that ended in a brawl with Naomi and Lynch getting the upper hand.

On the December 13, 2016, episode of SmackDown, a battle royal to determine the number one contenders for the SmackDown Tag Team Championship was won by The Hype Bros (Zack Ryder and Mojo Rawley). After the match, however, it was discovered that Ryder had injured his knee and required surgery. In response, a championship fatal four-way tag team elimination match occurred on the December 27 episode between American Alpha (Chad Gable and Jason Jordan), Heath Slater and Rhyno, The Usos (Jey Uso and Jimmy Uso), and defending champions The Wyatt Family (represented by Luke Harper and Randy Orton), where American Alpha won by last eliminating Orton to become the new champions. The Wyatt Family invoked their rematch clause for the January 10 episode, but American Alpha retained. On the January 31 episode, American Alpha made an open challenge to any tag team on the SmackDown roster. The Usos came out, followed by The Ascension (Konnor and Viktor), The Vaudevillains (Aiden English and Simon Gotch), Breezango (Tyler Breeze and Fandango), and Slater and Rhyno. A brawl ensued where American Alpha and Slater and Rhyno were the last standing. Afterwards on Talking Smack, a championship tag team turmoil match between the six teams was scheduled for Elimination Chamber.

On the December 27, 2016, episode of SmackDown, Dolph Ziggler was unsuccessful in winning the WWE Championship in a triple threat match against Baron Corbin and then-champion AJ Styles. The following week, Ziggler lost to Corbin in a singles match. After the match, Corbin attempted to beat Ziggler with a chair, but Kalisto came to Ziggler's aid and Corbin backed down. Out of anger, Ziggler superkicked Kalisto, stating that he did not need Kalisto's or anyone's help. Backstage, Ziggler trashed the locker room. Apollo Crews tried talking to Ziggler, but Ziggler attacked Crews, turning heel. On the January 10 episode, Kalisto defeated Ziggler. After the match, Ziggler took out his anger on Kalisto, beating him with a chair. Crews came to Kalisto's aid, but was also hit with the chair. The following week, Ziggler appeared in the King's Court with Jerry Lawler to discuss his actions, which ended with Ziggler superkicking Lawler. On the January 24 episode, Ziggler defeated Kalisto. After the match, he again tried to beat Kalisto with a chair, but was instead attacked by Crews. Ziggler defeated Kalisto again the following week, and after the match, he tried removing Kalisto's mask, but Crews made the save. Ziggler then faced Crews on the next episode, where Crews quickly won with a roll up pin. Ziggler then attacked Crews with a chair, but was saved by Kalisto. Backstage, Ziggler claimed that he could beat both Crews and Kalisto at the same time. Daniel Bryan then scheduled Ziggler to face the two in a handicap match at Elimination Chamber.

After some run-ins and the two trading barbs at one another on social media, on February 10, a match between Mojo Rawley and Curt Hawkins was scheduled for the Elimination Chamber Kickoff pre-show.

Event

Pre-show
During the Elimination Chamber Kickoff pre-show, Mojo Rawley faced Curt Hawkins. Rawley performed a Tilt-A-Whirl Powerslam on Hawkins for the win.

Preliminary matches
The actual pay-per-view opened with Becky Lynch facing Mickie James. James executed the Mick Kick on Lynch for a delayed near-fall. In the climax, James attempted a Mickie DDT but Lynch countered into a Schoolboy for the win.

Next, Dolph Ziggler faced Apollo Crews and Kalisto in a Handicap match. Before the match, Ziggler attacked Kalisto. Mid-match, Kalisto recovered and got to the ring. In the end, Kalisto performed a Spin Kick on Ziggler, which was followed by a Delayed Spin Out Powerbomb by Crews to win the match. After the match, Ziggler attacked both men and injured Crews' ankle with a chair.

After that, American Alpha defended the SmackDown Tag Team Championship in a tag team turmoil match. Heath Slater and Rhyno and Breezango began the match. Breezango were eliminated after Rhyno performed a Gore on Fandango. The Vaudevillians entered the match next, but were quickly eliminated when Slater pinned Aiden English after a Smash Hit. The Usos came in next and eliminated Slater and Rhyno when Jimmy performed a Superkick on Slater. American Alpha, the reigning champions, entered next and eliminated The Usos when Gable pinned Jey with a Schoolboy. The Usos then attacked American Alpha before being escorted out by officials. The Ascension, the final team to enter the match, executed the Fall of Man on Jordan, but Gable broke up the pinfall. Gable and Jordan performed the Grand Amplitude on Viktor to retain the titles.

In the fourth match, Nikki Bella fought Natalya. Natalya applied the Sharpshooter, but Nikki countered into The Fearless Lock, with Natalya touching the ring ropes. Natalya and Nikki fought outside of the ring, leading to a double countout. As Natalya was leaving the ring, Nikki attacked her once again until referees separated them. Later, during a backstage segment, Natalya attacked Nikki from behind. During the brawl, Nikki tipped over a make-up table, spilling the powder over herself and Maryse.

In the fifth match, Randy Orton faced Luke Harper. In the climax, as Harper attempted a Discus Clothesline, Orton countered into an RKO to win the match.

Next, Alexa Bliss defended the SmackDown Women's Championship against Naomi. As Bliss attempted Twisted Bliss, Naomi countered by raising her knees and executed a Split-Legged Moonsault to win the championship.

Main event
In the main event, the WWE Championship was defended in the Elimination Chamber match. Defending champion John Cena and AJ Styles were the first two contestants. Intercontinental Champion Dean Ambrose entered next, followed by Bray Wyatt and Baron Corbin. As Miz was due to enter the chamber, he remained in his pod. Ambrose rolled-up a distracted Corbin to eliminate him. Corbin attacked Ambrose, threw him through a pod and performed the End of Days on Ambrose before leaving the chamber. Miz then quickly eliminated Ambrose. Cena eliminated Miz after an Attitude Adjustment. Styles and Wyatt attacked Cena before Wyatt attacked Styles. Styles and Cena both scored nearfalls against each other, after a Styles Clash and an Attitude Adjustment respectively. Wyatt then executed Sister Abigail on Cena, eliminating him. As Styles attempted the Phenomenal Forearm, Wyatt caught Styles and executed Sister Abigail to win his first WWE Championship. Randy Orton emerged and the two had a brief staredown before Wyatt celebrated his victory in the ring.

Aftermath
The following episode of SmackDown, John Cena invoked his rematch clause, but AJ Styles also demanded the one-on-one rematch he had been promised. A triple threat match for the WWE Championship occurred and Wyatt retained, despite being attacked by Luke Harper. Afterwards, Royal Rumble winner Randy Orton declared that he would not fight Wyatt for the title at WrestleMania 33 due to his devotion to Wyatt. A 10-man battle royal happened the next week to find a new opponent for Wyatt. Styles, who did not get his promised one-one-one rematch, was the first confirmed entrant. The battle royal ended in a draw after Harper and Styles eliminated each other simultaneously. Styles defeated Harper the following week to become the number one contender, however, Orton betrayed Wyatt and reclaimed his right to face Wyatt at WrestleMania. Due to this confusion, Orton faced Styles on the March 7 episode of SmackDown to determine the decisive number one contender. Orton won the match, confirming that he would face Wyatt at WrestleMania. The following week, an irate Styles attacked Shane McMahon backstage. He was subsequently fired by Daniel Bryan, however, Shane appeared at the end of the show and said he would face Styles in a match at WrestleMania.

Also on the episode following the pay-per-view, Naomi revealed that she had sustained a knee injury during her match with Alexa Bliss, who allowed Naomi one week to heal for a rematch. Mickie James then defeated Becky Lynch in their rematch. On the February 21 episode, Naomi was not cleared to defend her title within 30 days and was forced to vacate the SmackDown Women's Championship. Daniel Bryan then had Bliss face Lynch for the vacant title, which Bliss won. On the March 7 episode, after claiming to be the greatest female wrestler on the SmackDown roster, Daniel Bryan scheduled Bliss to defend the title against all available female wrestlers on SmackDown's roster at WrestleMania 33. James then turned on Bliss after a subsequent tag team match, and James, Lynch, and Natalya were confirmed for the WrestleMania match. Carmella then confirmed that she would be in the WrestleMania match, and Naomi returned on the March 28 episode, confirming she would be in the match, making it a six-pack challenge at WrestleMania.

Also on the episode following the pay-per-view, Dean Ambrose, who had been looking for Baron Corbin, was brutally attacked and hospitalized by Corbin before his match with James Ellsworth. The following week, Ambrose caused Corbin's elimination in the battle royal and Corbin attacked Ambrose with the End of Days. Ambrose called out Corbin over the next couple of weeks, and Corbin challenged Ambrose to a match at WrestleMania 33 for the Intercontinental Championship, which Ambrose accepted. Also in the mid-card, Dolph Ziggler claimed that he would eliminate the new generation of wrestlers. During the number one contender's battle royal, Ziggler eliminated Kalisto, but was in turn eliminated by Apollo Crews. Ziggler took out his anger on Kalisto with a chair, which caused the distracted Crews to be eliminated. Ziggler and Crews then had a chairs match on the February 28 episode that Ziggler won. Crews, Kalisto, and Ziggler were confirmed for the 2017 André the Giant Memorial Battle Royal, along with Mojo Rawley and Curt Hawkins, on the WrestleMania pre-show.

After another backstage brawl, Daniel Bryan scheduled a Falls Count Anywhere match between Nikki Bella and Natalya for the February 21 episode. That episode, Natalya defeated Nikki thanks to help from Maryse, who attacked Nikki. The following week, Nikki's boyfriend John Cena was the guest on Miz TV due to The Miz eliminating Cena in the battle royal the previous week. After Cena insulted Miz, his wife Maryse slapped Cena, and Nikki came out and ran off Maryse along with Miz. The following week, after Cena and Nikki defeated Ellsworth and Carmella, The Miz and Maryse attacked the two. A match pitting Cena and Nikki against Miz and Maryse at WrestleMania was scheduled by Daniel Bryan since Bryan could not face Miz, who had been insulting Bryan for several months.

Also on the episode following the pay-per-view, SmackDown Tag Team Champions American Alpha defeated The Ascension. After the match, The Usos issued a warning to American Alpha, and continued their antagonizing the following week. The Usos defeated American Alpha in a non-title match on the March 14 episode, and subsequently defeated them for the titles the following week, becoming the first team to win both the Raw Tag Team Championship (then known as WWE Tag Team Championship when they held it) and SmackDown Tag Team Championship. Although The Usos wanted to defend their titles at WrestleMania, they were scheduled for the 2017 André the Giant Memorial Battle Royal, along with SmackDown's other tag teams, including American Alpha, Breezango, The Ascension, The Vaudevillains, and Heath Slater and Rhyno.

While the 2017 event was held exclusively for SmackDown, the 2018 event was in turn held exclusively for Raw.

Results

Tag Team Turmoil match

Elimination Chamber match

References

External links 
 

2017 WWE Network events
2017
Events in Phoenix, Arizona
2017 in Arizona
Professional wrestling in Phoenix, Arizona
2017 WWE pay-per-view events
February 2017 events in the United States
WWE SmackDown